This article is about the fungal life of Metropolitan France. For the fungi in the French Overseas territories, see: Fungi of French Guiana, Fungi of French Polynesia, Fungi of Martinique, Fungi of Réunion, Fungi of Guadeloupe and Fungi of Mayotte.

Fungi include:
 Agaricus bisporus, the common mushroom
 Boletus edulis, the cep
 Tuber melanosporum, the black Périgord truffle

Other edible species:
 Agaricus aestivalis
 Agaricus annae
 Agaricus arvensis
 Agaricus augustus
 Agaricus benesii
 Agaricus bitorquis
 Agaricus campestris
 Agaricus essettei
 Agaricus haemorrhoidarius
 Agaricus langei
 Agaricus macrocarpus
 Agaricus macrosporus
 Agaricus nivescens
 Agaricus silvaticus
 Agaricus silvicola
 Agrocybe cylindracea
 Agrocybe praecox
 Aleuria aurantia
 Amanita aspera
 Amanita caesarea
 Amanita crocea
 Amanita fulva
 Amanita lividopallescens
 Amanita ovoidea
 Amanita rubescens
 Amanita spissa
 Amanita vaginata
 Auricularia auricula-judae
 Balsamia vulgaris
 Boletus aereus
 Boletus aestivalis
 Boletus appendiculatus
 Boletus betulicola
 Boletus depilatus
 Boletus erythropus
 Boletus fechtneri
 Boletus impolitus
 Boletus luridus
 Boletus mamorensis
 Boletus persoonii
 Boletus pinophilus
 Boletus pseudoregius
 Boletus queletii
 Boletus regius
 Boletus subappendiculatus
 Bovista nigrescens
 Calocybe gambosa
 Cantharellus amethysteus
 Cantharellus cibarius
 Cantharellus ferruginascens
 Cantharellus subpruinosus
 Cantharellus friesii
 Choiromyces venosus
 Chroogomphus helveticus
 Chroogomphus rutilus
 Clavariadelphus pistillaris
 Clavulina rugosa
 Clitocybe alexandri
 Clitocybe costata
 Clitocybe geotropa
 Clitocybe gibba
 Clitocybe odora
 Clitopilus prunulus
 Collybia fusipes
 Coprinus comatus
 Cortinarius alboviolaceus
 Cortinarius largus
 Cortinarius praestans
 Craterellus cornucopioides
 Craterellus cinereus
 Craterellus crispus
 Craterellus ianthinoxanthus
 Craterellus konradii
 Craterellus lutescens
 Craterellus melanoxeros
 Craterellus tubaeformis
 Craterellus tubaeformis var.lutescens
 Craterellus undulatus
 Cuphophyllus colemannianus
 Cuphophyllus niveus
 Cuphophyllus pratensis
 Cuphophyllus virgineus
 Dendropolyporus umbellatus
 Disciotis venosa
 Entoloma aprile
 Entoloma clypeatum
 Entoloma sepium
 Fistulina hepatica
 Flammulina velutipes
 Gomphidius glutinosus
 Gomphus clavatus
 Grifola frondosa
 Gyroporus cyanescens
 Hebeloma edurum
 Hydnum repandum
 Hydnum rufescens
 Hygrophoropsis aurantiaca
 Hygrophorus camarophyllus
 Hygrophorus capreolarius
 Hygrophorus penarius
 Hygrophorus poetarum
 Hygrophorus russula
 Kuehneromyces mutabilis
 Laccaria affinis
 Laccaria amethystina
 Laccaria bicolor
 Laccaria fraterna
 Laccaria laccata
 Lactarius deliciosus
 Lactarius deterrimus
 Lactarius lignyotus
 Lactarius picinus
 Lactarius sanguifluus
 Lactarius semisanguifluus
 Lactarius vinosus
 Lactarius volemus
 Laetiporus sulphureus
 Langermannia gigantea
 Leccinum aurantiacum
 Leccinum crocipodium
 Leccinum duriusculum
 leccinum quercinum
 Leccinum versipelle
 Leccinum vulpinum
 Lentinellus cochleatus
 Lentinula edodes
 Lentinus cyathiformis
 Lepista flaccida
 Lepista glaucocana
 Lepista inversa
 Lepista irina
 Lepista nuda
 Lepista panaeolus
 Lepista saeva
 Lepista sordida
 Lespiaultinia oligosperma
 Leucoagaricus leucothites
 Leucocortinarius bulbiger
 Leucopaxillus giganteus
 Lycoperdon perlatum
 Lyophyllum decastes
 Macrolepiota excoriata
 Macrolepiota gracilenta
 Macrolepiota konradii
 Macrolepiota mastoidea
 Macrolepiota procera
 Macrolepiota rhacodes
 Marasmius oreades
 Meripilus giganteus
 Mitrophora fusca
 Mitrophora semilibera
 Morchella atrotomentosa
 Morchella conica
 Morchella costata
 Morchella crassipes
 Morchella deliciosa
 Morchella distans
 Morchella elata
 Morchella esculenta
 Morchella hortensis
 Morchella olivea
 Morchella pragensis
 Morchella rotunda
 Morchella rudis
 Morchella umbrinovelutipes
 Otidea onotica
 Phaeolepiota aurea
 Pholiota nameko
 Pleurotus citrinopileatus
 Pleurotus columbinus
 Pleurotus cornucopiae
 Pleurotus dryinus
 Pleurotus eryngii
 Pleurotus nebrodensis
 Pleurotus ostreatus
 Pleurotus pulmonarius
 Pleurotus salmoneostramineus
 Pseudohydnum gelatinosum
 Ramaria aurea
 Ramaria botrytis
 Rozites caperatus
 Russula cutefracta
 Russula cyanoxantha
 Russula cyanoxantha var.peltereaui
 Russula heterophylla
 Russula mustelina
 Russula vesca
 Russula grisea
 Russula virescens
 Scutiger ovinus
 Scutiger pes-caprae
 Sparassis brevipes
 Sparassis crispa
 Strobilurus esculentus
 Strobilurus stephanocystis
 Stropharia rugosoannulata
 Suillus bellinii
 Suillus collinitus
 Suillus granulatus
 Suillus grevillei
 Suillus luteus
 Terfezia arenaria
 Terfezia claveryi
 Tremiscus helvelloides
 Tricholoma argyraceum
 Tricholoma atrosquamosum
 Tricholoma basirubens
 Tricholoma caligatum
 Tricholoma cingulatum
 Tricholoma colossus
 Tricholoma columbetta
 Tricholoma gausapatum
 Tricholoma inocyboides
 Tricholoma myomyces
 Tricholoma orirubens
 Tricholoma portentosum
 Tricholoma scalpturatum
 Tricholoma squarrulosum
 Tricholoma terreum
 Tuber aestivum
 Tuber blotii
 Tuber borchii
 Tuber brumale
 Tuber macrosporum
 Tuber mesentericum
 Tuber uncinatum
 Verpa bohemica
 Verpa conica
 Volvariella bombycina
 Volvariella speciosa
 Volvariella volvacea
 Xerocomus armeniacus
 Xerocomus badius
 Xerocomus chrysenteron
 Xerocomus communis
 Xerocomus ferrugineus
 Xerocomus lanatus
 Xerocomus pruinatus
 Xerocomus rubellus
 Xerocomus subtomentosus

See also 
 Fungi of Australia
 Wildlife of Metropolitan France
 Outline of France

References 

 List